Inner Wheel is an international women's organisation to create friendship, service and understanding. It has clubs in over 100 countries with over 100,000 members. It was founded in Manchester.

History
The organisation was officially founded on 10 January 1924 by Margarette Golding, a nurse, business woman and the wife of a Manchester Rotarian. who had met with 26 other wives in November 1923. The first meeting was held on 10 January 1924 when 27 ladies attended. This date is now known as "International Inner Wheel Day". This organisation was originally established for the wives and daughters of Rotarians although no Rotary connection is now required. Gradually other groups formed themselves into Inner Wheel Clubs and in 1934 the Association of Inner Wheel Clubs in Great Britain and Ireland was formed.

The number of clubs around the world grew and in 1967 the International Inner Wheel came into being. There are clubs in many countries around the world. Inner Wheel clubs are grouped into districts with twenty-nine districts within Great Britain and Ireland. Most clubs meet monthly, often with a speaker at the meeting but members meet socially on a regular basis. Clubs raise and donate money to a huge variety of charities.

Helena Foster, who was the President in 1969–70, proposed that "Inner Wheel Day" should be celebrated on 10 January each year on the day that the original Manchester group adopted the name of "Inner Wheel" in 1924.
 
Following the decision taken at an International Convention in 2012, membership was opened up to all women over the age of 18.

The International Inner Wheel objectives are (a) promoting true friendship, (b) encouraging the ideals of personal service, and (c) fostering international understanding.

In 2008, Inner Wheel had over 100,000 members in 102 countries and was one of the largest women's organisations with consultative status at the United Nations.

References

External links

Rotary International
International women's organizations
Organizations established in 1924
1924 establishments in the United Kingdom